Three German ships have been named SMS Hansa.

, a paddle-wheeled steamer built in the United States in 1847–1848, operated by the German Federal fleet
, an ironclad warship
, a protected cruiser

See also
 (aka HSK 5(II), Schiff 5), a World War II German Kriegsmarine training ship, a merchant ship completed as a commerce raider
 Hansa (disambiguation)

German Navy ship names